Daniel Felipe Ruiz Rivera (born 30 July 2001) is a Colombian footballer who plays as winger for Brazilian club Santos, on loan from Millonarios, and the Colombia national team.

Club career

Fortaleza CEIF
Born in Bogotá, Ruiz began his career with a local side named CD Dinhos, before joining Deportivo Cali's youth setup in 2016. After two years playing for the latter, he left and moved to Fortaleza CEIF.

Ruiz made his senior debut with Fortaleza on 7 October 2018, playing the last four minutes in a 1–1 Categoría Primera B away draw against Deportes Quindío; it was his only appearance of the season. He subsequently started to feature more regularly for the side, becoming a starter in the later stages of the 2020 season and scoring his first goal on 14 November of that year, in a 1–1 draw at Llaneros.

Millonarios
On 30 December 2020, Ruiz moved to Categoría Primera A side Millonarios on a one-year loan deal, with a buyout clause. He made his club – and top tier – debut on 16 January 2021, replacing Emerson Rodríguez in a 1–0 home win over Envigado.

Ruiz scored his first goal in the main category on 20 June 2021, netting the opener in a 2–1 home loss against Deportes Tolima. On 12 September, he scored a brace in a 4–3 win at Atlético Bucaramanga.

In January 2022, Millonarios bought Ruiz outright, for a rumoured fee of US$ 350,000; Fortaleza also kept 20% over a future sale.

Loan to Santos
On 7 February 2023, Ruiz moved abroad for the first time in his career, after agreeing to a loan deal with Brazilian club Santos until the end of the year. He made his debut with the club nine days later, replacing Sandry in a 1–1 Campeonato Paulista away draw against Santo André.

International career
After representing Colombia at under-20 level in a friendly in 2021, Ruiz received his first call-up for the full side on 18 January 2023, for a friendly against the United States. He made his full international debut ten days later, replacing Dylan Borrero in the 0–0 draw at the Dignity Health Sports Park in Carson, California.

Career statistics

Club

International

References

2001 births
Living people
Footballers from Bogotá
Colombian footballers
Association football wingers
Categoría Primera A players
Categoría Primera B players
Fortaleza C.E.I.F. footballers
Millonarios F.C. players
Santos FC players
Colombia under-20 international footballers
Colombia international footballers
Colombian expatriate footballers
Colombian expatriate sportspeople in Brazil
Expatriate footballers in Brazil